The 1972 season in Japanese football introduced a Second Division to the Japan Soccer League. Nine clubs were chosen from the 1971 Japanese Regional Leagues; when Nagoya Mutual Bank resigned from the League, a tenth club was chosen from the Kansai League.

League tables

JSL First Division
No relegation took place as the First Division was being expanded to 10 clubs.

JSL Second Division
Toyota Motors, later one of the Japanese big names as Nagoya Grampus, was crowned the inaugural Second Division champion. Tanabe Pharmaceutical, a club from Osaka, followed them into the expanded 10-team First Division. No relegations took place, to keep the Second Division at 10 clubs.

References

1972
1
Jap
Jap